Acer miaotaiense (syn. Acer miyabei subsp. miaotaiense (P.C.Tsoong) E.Murray) is a species of maple endemic to China. It grows in mixed forests of southeastern Gansu, southwestern Henan, northwestern Hubei, southern Shaanxi, and Zhejiang.

It is a medium-sized deciduous tree growing to 25 m tall, with rough, grey-brown bark. The leaves are three-lobed, 4–9 cm long and 5–8 cm broad, with a 6–7 cm long petiole; the petiole bleeds white latex if cut. The flowers are produced in spring at the same time as the leaves open, yellow-green, in erect corymbs. The fruit is a samara with two winged seeds aligned at 180°, each seed 8 mm wide, flat, with a 2 cm wing.

It is closely related to Acer miyabei from Japan, and Acer campestre from Europe. It is a rare tree, considered "Vulnerable" by the International Union for Conservation of Nature (IUCN).

References

miaotaiense
Trees of China
Endemic flora of China
Near threatened plants
Taxonomy articles created by Polbot